Seneca High School is a four-year comprehensive public high school in Burlington County, New Jersey that operates as part of the Lenape Regional High School District. The district serves students in ninth through twelfth grades from Shamong Township, Southampton Township,  Tabernacle Township and Woodland Township. Seneca High School serves students from four of the communities: Shamong Township, Southampton Township, Tabernacle Township and Woodland Township. Seneca is the newest of the Lenape Regional High School District's four high schools. The school has been accredited by the Middle States Association of Colleges and Schools Commission on Elementary and Secondary Schools since 2008.

As of the 2021–22 school year, the school had an enrollment of 1,026 students and 101.0 classroom teachers (on an FTE basis), for a student–teacher ratio of 10.2:1. There were 89 students (8.7% of enrollment) eligible for free lunch and 31 (3.0% of students) eligible for reduced-cost lunch.

History
Approved by voters in 1997 as the district's fourth high school, the  Seneca High School was expected to be completed by 2000, to be constructed on a  site designed to accommodate an enrollment of 2,000. The school opened in September 2003 with 860 students from Shamong, Southampton, Tabernacle and Woodland Townships and was completed at a cost of $45.7 million (equivalent to $ million in ). Delays caused by lawsuits related to the building site in the Pinelands resulted in budget overruns of $8.7 million.

The school's name had been chosen by the district in December 2000 to carry on the practice of assigning the schools Native American names, with Seneca being selected based on its traditional presence in the area. The nickname "Golden Eagles" was selected from a number of alternatives based on animals, rather than choosing a nickname related to Native Americans as had been done with the district's three other schools.

The school's opening allowed the enrollment level at Lenape High School and Shawnee High School to drop, helping alleviate the crowding the schools had faced. Based on the number of students who chose to switch to Seneca, there would be 150 students in 2005 in the school's first graduating class.

Awards, recognition and rankings
The school was the 111th-ranked public high school in New Jersey out of 339 schools statewide in New Jersey Monthly magazine's September 2014 cover story on the state's "Top Public High Schools", using a new ranking methodology. The school had been ranked 119th in the state of 328 schools in 2012, after being ranked 135th in 2010 out of 322 schools listed. The magazine ranked the school 134th in 2008 out of 316 schools. The school was ranked 258th in the magazine's September 2006 issue, which surveyed 316 schools across the state.

Schooldigger.com ranked the school 82nd out of 381 public high schools statewide in its 2011 rankings (an increase of 14 positions from the 2010 ranking) which were based on the combined percentage of students classified as proficient or above proficient on the mathematics (89.5%) and language arts literacy (95.9%) components of the High School Proficiency Assessment (HSPA).

Athletics
The Seneca High School Golden Eagles participate in the Olympic Conference (New Jersey), which is comprised of public and private high schools in Burlington and Camden counties and operates under the auspices of the New Jersey State Interscholastic Athletic Association (NJSIAA). With 856 students in grades 10-12, the school was classified by the NJSIAA for the 2019–20 school year as Group III for most athletic competition purposes, which included schools with an enrollment of 761 to 1,058 students in that grade range. The football team competes in the Constitution Division of the 95-team West Jersey Football League superconference and was classified by the NJSIAA as Group III South for football for 2018–2020.

Seneca has an abundance of activities available to its students through its sports programs. The school goes by the moniker the Golden Eagles, which was chosen by the district in December 2000 as a departure from the Native American-themed nicknames of the other three schools.

The boys' track team coached by Rich Watson, a physics teacher at Seneca, has had success with standouts such as the 2006 shuttle hurdle team, and record setting performances by Drew Kanz-Oshea in the High Jump: 7'1 (2009), and Michael Maira in the Pole Vault: 15'0" (2008-2010). Both were multiple-time state champions.

The 2006 football team made it to South Jersey Group III final and lost to Lacey Township High School 12–0. The loss ended the team's undefeated season. The team finished 11–1, ranked #1 among South Jersey Large Schools by the Courier-Post.

The 2006 girls' tennis team won the South Jersey Group III state sectional championship with a pair of 5-0 wins, defeating Ocean City High School in the semifinals and Shawnee High School in the finals.

The baseball team won the Group III state championship in 2007 (defeating Cranford High School in the tournament final) and 2011 (vs. Paramus High School). The baseball team won the 2007 Group III title, defeating Ocean Township High School 5–4 in the semifinals and Cranford High School by a score of 5–2 in the group final. The team also won the Group III state championship in 2011, defeating Paramus High School by a score of 12–3 in the tournament final.

The girls track team won the indoor track Group III state championship in 2009 (as co-champion) and 2010.

The girls' track team won the Group III state indoor relay championship in 2009.

The 2014 and 2015 boys lacrosse teams advanced to the South Jersey Group II state championship games. Attackman Kevin Gray named 2015 US Lacrosse High School All American.

In 2016, Joe Manchio became the school's first individual state champion in wrestling at Boardwalk Hall in Atlantic City. He won the 106 pound state title, defeating Paulsboro High School's Nick Duca 5–4.

The field hockey team won the Central Jersey Group II state sectional championship in 2017-2019.

Administration
The school's principal is Bradley Bauer. His core administration team includes five assistant principals.

Notable alumni
 Kevin Comer (born 1992, class of 2011), professional baseball pitcher is a free agent.
 Sonya Deville (born 1993), wrestler, currently signed to WWE under the WWE SmackDown brand.

Notable faculty
 Jay Black (born 1976), comedian, screenwriter and actor.

Other schools in the district
Other schools in the district (with 2021–22 enrollment data from the National Center for Education Statistics) are:
 Cherokee High School - located in Evesham Township, with 2,165 students from Evesham Township
 Lenape High School – located in Medford Township, with 1,924 students from Mount Laurel Township
 Shawnee High School – located in Medford Township, with 1,500 students from Medford Lakes and Medford Township

References

External links 

Lenape Regional High School District

Data for the Lenape Regional High School District, National Center for Education Statistics
Alumni Community

2003 establishments in New Jersey
Educational institutions established in 2003
Middle States Commission on Secondary Schools
Public high schools in Burlington County, New Jersey
Shamong Township, New Jersey
Southampton Township, New Jersey
Tabernacle Township, New Jersey
Woodland Township, New Jersey